Battle Creek is a  long tributary of the Owyhee River. In 2009,  of the creek were designated as wild by the Omnibus Public Land Management Act, which also created the Owyhee River Wilderness.

See also
List of rivers of Idaho
List of longest streams of Idaho
List of National Wild and Scenic Rivers

References

Rivers of Idaho
Owyhee River
Rivers of Owyhee County, Idaho
Wild and Scenic Rivers of the United States